Limacella delicata is a mushroom species in the genus Limacella.  It is also sometimes known under the synonym Limacella glioderma (Fr.) Maire.

References 

Amanitaceae
Fungi of Europe
Taxa named by Elias Magnus Fries